The Cork-Dublin rivalry is a hurling rivalry between Irish county teams Cork and Dublin, who first played each other in 1895. The fixture has been an irregular one due to both teams playing in separate provinces. Cork's home ground is Páirc Uí Chaoimh and Dublin's home ground is Parnell Park, however, most of their championship meetings have been held at neutral venues, usually Croke Park.

While Cork are regarded as one of the "big three" of hurling, with Kilkenny and Tipperary completing the trio, Dublin are ranked joint fifth in the all-time roll of honour and have enjoyed sporadic periods of dominance at various stages throughout the history of the championship. The two teams have won a combined total of 36 All-Ireland Senior Hurling Championship titles.

As of 2014 Cork and Dublin have met fourteen times in the hurling championship including meeting eight times at the All Ireland final stage where Cork hold the upper hand with six victories to Dublin's two triumphs.

Roots

History

Meetings between Cork and Dublin have been rare throughout the history of the championship, however, there have been some periods of dominance with more frequent clashes. Between 1919 and 1928 Cork and Dublin dominated the championship. The teams clashed in four All-Ireland finals, with both sides recording two victories each. Again, between 1941 and 1944 Cork and Dublin met in three All-Ireland finals in four years. Cork dominated the championship during this era, winning a record-setting four All-Ireland titles in succession.

Statistics

Notable moments

 Cork 5-20 : 2-0 Dublin (24 March 1895 at Clonturk Park) - The very first championship clash between Cork, represented by Blackrock, and Dublin, represented by Rapparees, was the delayed 1894 All-Ireland final. Cork entered the game in search of history by becoming the first team to win three successive All-Ireland championships, while Dublin received a bye to the final as they faced no opposition in Leinster. A day of wind, rain and hail saw Cork play a defensive game. A half-time score of 2-5 to 2-0 was not enough for Dublin as Cork played with a strong wind in the second half. Dublin were held scoreless as Cork recorded a further 3-15 in the second half.
 Dublin 4-8 : 1-3 Cork (4 September 1927 at Croke Park) - Reigning All-Ireland champions Cork were confident of retaining their title as they faced Dublin in the All-Ireland final. The team contained household names and some of the greatest hurlers ever to play the game, while the Dublin team was made up entirely of non-Dublinmen. Goalkeeper Tommy Daly gave an inspirational display and at half-time Dublin were ahead by 2-3 o 0-1. The writing was on the wall as Dublin went on to dominate the second-half and secure only their second ever victory over Cork.

All-time results

Legend

Senior

Junior

Minor

External links
 Cork-Dublin head-to-head results

Dublin
Dublin county hurling team rivalries